Sovinek is a small village in the Municipality of Semič in southeastern Slovenia. Until 2001, the area was part of the settlements of Coklovca, Oskoršnica, and Praprot. The village is part of the traditional region of White Carniola and is included in the Southeast Slovenia Statistical Region.

References

External links
Sovinek on Geopedia

Populated places in the Municipality of Semič
Populated places established in 2001
2001 establishments in Slovenia